Afon Tanat is a river in northern Powys, Wales. Its source is close to the Cyrniau Nod mountain, to the north of Lake Vyrnwy. The river flows in a generally east-south-east direction until it joins the River Vyrnwy near Llansantffraid-ym-Mechain. For a short distance prior to its confluence it flows within western Shropshire, England.

Its tributaries include the Afon Eirth, Afon Rhaeadr, Afon Iwrch and Afon Goch.

References

External links

Tanat
Tanat
1Tanat